James Justinian Morier (15 August 1782 – 19 March 1849) was a British diplomat and author noted for his novels about the Qajar dynasty in Iran, most famously for the Hajji Baba series. These were filmed in 1954.

Early life

Morier was born in Ottoman Smyrna, the second son of Isaac Morier, a Swiss-born merchant, British by naturalisation, and a member of the London-based Levant Company, and Elizabeth Clara Van Lennep. After private education in England, he worked in his father's Smyrna business between 1799 and 1806.

Diplomatic career

Career in Iran
Through the influence of his uncle, Admiral William Waldegrave, 1st Baron Radstock, he entered the diplomatic service. He first visited Iran in 1808 as secretary to Harford Jones-Brydges, a special British envoy to the Shah, publishing an account of his experiences in 1812 under the title A Journey through Iran, Armenia and Asia Minor to Constantinople in the years 1808 and 1809. In 1809 he accompanied the Iranian envoy, Mirza Abul Hasan, to Britain, and in 1810 returned to Iran as Secretary of Embassy on the staff of Sir Gore Ouseley, first Ambassador to Iran. He remained there as Chargé d'Affaires in 1814–1816. After his return to England he published A Second Journey through Iran to Constantinople between the years 1810 and 1816.

Commissioner to Mexico
Morier married Harriet Fulke Greville in London in 1820. Between 1824 and 1826 he was special commissioner to Mexico, where he negotiated a British-Mexican Treaty of Amity, Commerce and Navigation ratified in 1827.

Writing career
With his knowledge of Eastern life and manners, Morier wrote several entertaining novels. The most popular were The Adventures of Hajji Baba of Ispahan (1824) and its sequel, The Adventures of Hajji Baba of Ispahan in England (1828). The former novel is a sort of Gil Blas set in Persia. The Persian minister to England is said to have protested in behalf of his government against its satire and manner of speaking. There followed Zohrab the Hostage (1832), Ayesha the Maid of Kars (1834), and The Mirza (1841), all full of brilliant description, character-painting, and delicate satire, and several others of lesser quality.
The Adventures of Hajji Baba of Ispahan (1824) 1937 edition, Random House, illustrated by the well-travelled Cyrus Leroy Baldridge. Baldridge had a hand in everything, from designing the cover and drawing dozens of illustrations to choosing the typeface and paper. A Persian translation of the book was produced by Douglas Craven Phillott.
The Adventures of Hajji Baba of Ispahan 1947 edition, The Heritage Press, imprint of The George Macy Companies, illustrated by Honore Guilbeau, preface by Sir Walter Scott

Death
Morier died suddenly in Brighton on 19 March 1849, from "cerebral congestion". His wife died in London in 1858.

Legacy
The Adventures of Hajji Baba is an American movie, based on the Hajji Baba novels, which was produced in 1954.

Operation Hajji Baba, a humanitarian airlift operation conducted in 1952 by the US Air Force, took its name from the Hajji Baba novels.

Morier is credited with introducing into English the word "bosh", meaning absurd or foolish talk. It derives from the Turkish word boş meaning "empty".

In 1842, botanist Boiss. published Moriera a genus of flowering plants from Central Asia, belonging to the family Brassicaceae in his honour.

Notes

References

Johnston, Henry McKenzie. Ottoman and Iranian (Persian) Odysseys. I B Tauris & Co Ltd, 1998.
Boyne, Walter J. "The Pilgrim Airlift". Air Force Magazine,  March 2007.

External links

The Adventures of Hajji Baba of Ispahan set forth in Eighty Chapters, full text
The Adventures of Hajji Baba of Ispahan, excerpt at Project Gutenberg
Ayesha, Maid of Kars at Internet Archive

1780 births
1849 deaths
British diplomats
19th-century British novelists
Smyrniote Levantines
Fellows of the Royal Society
British expatriates in Iran
British male novelists
James Justinian
British expatriates in the Ottoman Empire
19th-century British male writers